Pedro Abreu Pascal (born 1 February 1957) is a Cuban basketball player. He competed in the 1980 Summer Olympics.

References

1957 births
Living people
Basketball players at the 1980 Summer Olympics
Cuban men's basketball players
Olympic basketball players of Cuba